South London Storm is a rugby league club who play and train at Archbishop Lanfranc School in the London Borough of Croydon, they currently compete in the London and South East Merit League.

Founded in 1997, Storm have been voted Rugby League Conference "Club of the Year" three times, in 2002, 2005 and 2006.

In 2013 South London Storm merged with West London Sharks to form South West London Chargers.

Club Details & Personnel

Club honours
Harry Jepson Trophy (RLC National Champions): Winners 2006
Harry Jepson Trophy Semi Finals: 2006
RLC Club Of The Year: 2002, 2005, 2006
RLC Shield: Winners 2002
Active Sports Club Of The Year Award: 2004
BBC London Amateur Sports Club of the Year: 2006
RLC Premier South Division Winners: 2005, 2006, 2009
RLC Premier South Division Runners Up: 2007, 2008
RLC Premier South Grand Final Winners: 2005, 2006
RLC Premier South Grand Final Runners Up: 2007, 2008, 2009
London Academy Final: Winners 2009
London Amateur Rugby League (2nd XIII): Winners 2006
Gordon Anderton Memorial Trophy: Runners Up 1997–98, 1998–99
London League Cup: Runners Up 2000
Rugby League Challenge Cup: 2nd Round 2005

Player Records
Most Tries in a match: 6 Mark Nesbitt vs Aberavon Fighting Irish - 2003
Most Goals in a match: 17 Tom Bold vs Bedford Tigers - 2009
Most Points in a match: 38 Darren Bartley vs Kent Ravens - 2007
Most Tries in a season: 28 Louis Neethling - 2005
Most Goals in a season: 102 Louis Neethling - 2005
Most Points in a season: 316 Louis Neethling - 2005
Most First Grade Appearances: 102 Carl Zacharow - (2002–present)

Club Records
Most Points Scored: 102 vs Bedford Tigers - 2009
Most Points Conceded: 100 vs Crawley Jets - 2000 & West London Sharks - 2002
Biggest Home Win: (90 points) 94–4 vs London Skolars - 2005 & 102–12 vs Bedford Tigers - 2009
Biggest Away Win: (72 points) 76–4 vs Sunderland Nissan - 2005 & Greenwich Admirals - 2005
Biggest Home Defeat: (90 points) 0–90 vs London Skolars - 2001
Biggest Away Defeat: (98 points) 2–100 vs Crawley Jets - 2000
Highest Scoring Game: 114 points vs Bedford Tigers (102–12) - 2009
Lowest Scoring Game: 22 vs Ipswich Rhinos (18–4) - 2007
Longest Undefeated Run: 14 games - 24 June 2006 to 30 June 2007
Longest Run Without a Win: 9 games - 6 May 2000 to 1 July 2000

Club Awards

Coaches
  Julian Critchley - 1997–98
  Ian Curzon - 1998–99
  Julian Critchley & Graeme Harker - 2000
  Paul Johnstone - 2001
  Andy Fleming - 2001
  Julian Critchley & Graeme Harker - 2001
  Anthony Lipscombe - 2002
  Darryl Pitt - 2003 & 2004
  Rob Powell - 2005 & 2006
  Andy Gilvary &  Dave Wilson - 2007
  Marcus Tobin - 2008
  James Massara - 2009
  Paul Brown - 2011
  Ben Cramant &  Mick Gray - 2012

Former Players Now At Pro Clubs
 Will Sharp - Harlequins RL
 Lamont Bryan - Harlequins RL
 Corey Simms - London Skolars
 Adam Janowski - Harlequins RL
 Rob Powell - Harlequins RL (assistant coach)
 Alex Ingarfield - Harlequins RL
 Jack Kendall - England under 18 England deaf London Irish RFU - Dewsbury Rams RL.

South London Storm Dream Team
To mark Storm's 10th Anniversary the club announced their 1997–2007 Dream Team.

  Tane Kingi (2005–2007)
  Corey Simms (2002–2004)
  Keri Ryan (2001–2006)
  Carl Zacharow (2001–2007)
  Gavin Calloo (2001–2006)
  Michael Walker (2005–2007)
  Terry Reader (2001–2002)
  Gavin Hill (2005–2007)
  Mark Nesbitt (2002–2006)
  Koben Katipa (2003–2004)
  Alan Emerson (2006–2007)
  Louis Neethling (2004–2005)
  Paul Rice (2003–2004)
  Andrew Hames (2003–2007)
  Nick Byram (2000–2004)
  John Ferguson (2003–2005)
  Julian Critchley (1997–2000)

 Coach:  Rob Powell (2005–2006)
 Manager:  Steve Cook (2002–2007)

First Grade Playing Record - 2000 to 2011
Up to and including 2 July 2011.

Second Grade Playing Record - 2003 to 2011
Up to and including 2 July 2011.

Club history
The South London area has a strong rugby league tradition, and many of London’s most successful amateur clubs have come from this part of the capital. For nearly three decades clubs such as Streatham Celtic, Peckham Pumas and South London Warriors dominated the London League, and between them they won the title over twenty times. The mid-1990s heralded the demise of these once dominant clubs leaving the league without a club south of the Thames.

To fill this void the current South London club was formed on 21 July 1997 by Jed Donnelly, Graeme Harker and Julian Critchley in a bar after London Broncos' World Club Championship victory against Canberra Raiders on 21 July 1997. Initially nicknamed 'the Saints', as one of the founder members was a supporter of St Helens, the fledgling club recruited many of its players from the recently defunct east London, Bexleyheath and Peckham outfits, and they approached the local rugby union club, Streatham-Croydon, about basing themselves at their Frant Road ground. Storm's original colours were red and black.

London League
Saints were immediately accepted into the London League, and in their debut season they finished third in the Second Division behind Kingston and St Albans Centurions. That 1997/98 season culminated in an appearance in the Gordon Anderton Memorial Trophy Final against Reading Raiders at the New River Stadium. The 24–28 was a cruel blow for a team that were considered to have enjoyed the better of the game, but two controversial Raiders’ tries in the closing two minutes sealed Saints’ fate.

The 1998/99 season was one that promised much for Saints but, due to the near collapse of the league, that potential was largely unfulfilled, although South London did eventually emerge from the debris as runners-up to the London Colonials. A second successive appearance in the Gordon Anderton Memorial Trophy Final again ended in defeat (28–32), this time at the hands of a strong Metropolitan Police team.

It was in February 1999 that the club launched its junior section, initially at U11 only. The bulk of the youngsters came from the neighbouring Whitehorse Manor School where Saints scrum-half Lee Mason-Ellis was a teacher. They made their competitive debut two months later against Kingston Warriors, at the time the only other junior club in the capital, losing narrowly in an exciting encounter.

For the seniors, with the prospect of winter rugby league looking increasingly forlorn, South's thoughts turned to the new summer competition, the Rugby League Conference. The name of the club was changed to South London Storm as there were two other teams known as 'the Saints' in the Conference. Three months later the club was accepted into the Southern Division of the expanding competition. For the club's switch to summer in 2000 the colours were changed to maroon.

2000
It was a real baptism of fire for Storm in the RLC, as they managed only a single win – away at Kingston – to finish bottom of their group. The season opener at home to Oxford Cavaliers (4–62) was covered by the Independent newspaper. Despite suffering a number of maulings (including a 2–100 loss at the hands of Crawley Jets), enthusiasm never waned and the club did much to raise the profile of the sport in this corner of the capital. Amazingly, Storm's season ended with an appearance in the London League Final against St Albans Centurions. But once again Storm were left frustrated as the Hertfordshire side emerged victorious from a gripping encounter. A member of Storm's team that day, and Man of the Match, was Ryan Jones who went on the play for and captain the Welsh rugby union team, and who was a member of the tour to New Zealand.

The club made sporting history in October when the under-11s played their counterparts from Kingston Warriors in the curtain raiser to the England vs Australia Rugby League World Cup clash at Twickenham. It was the first ever game of rugby league at union's headquarters and Storm's Mark Cole, cousin of England footballer Joe Cole, scored the first ever try at the stadium and Rob Harker scored the first ever hat-trick of tries.

South London Storm was still operating, albeit as a Masters XIII, as recently as 2014, playing 1/2 fixtures a year

In 2017 they moved into Club Langley and played under the moniker of ‘Silverbacks’ for 3 seasons, during which a historic first ever Masters Tour to Canada was undertaken in June 2019

The first ever transatlantic Masters game between a UK Masters team against the Toronto Wolfpack Masters team at the Lamport stadium, followed by a further match against the Ontario Greybeards two days later

As is the nomadic existence of Rugby League in south London, we move onto the next chapter of the South London Storm - the South London Clippers Masters, playing out of Greenwich from 2020

Season's Record
First Grade

Rugby League Conference South

06/05/2000 South London Storm 4 Oxford Cavaliers 62
13/05/2000 West London Sharks 60 South London Storm 6
20/05/2000 Crawley Jets 100 South London Storm 2
27/05/2000 South London Storm 24 Kingston Warriors 26
03/06/2000 South London Storm 8 St Albans Centurions 58
10/06/2000 South London Storm 8 North London Skolars 78
17/06/2000 Oxford Cavaliers 72 South London Storm 0
24/06/2000 South London Storm 0 West London Sharks 68
01/07/2000 South London Storm 6 Crawley Jets 90
08/07/2000 Kingston Warriors 16 South London Storm 24
15/07/2000 St Albans Centurions 50 South London Storm 10
22/07/2000 North London Skolars 70 South London Storm 14

2001
2001 was a much improved year for the club and, although they won only three of their matches, Storm were a much more competitive outfit and got better as the year progressed, as narrow losses to the West London Sharks and North London Skolars proved towards the end of the season. The trio of wins, against Bedford Swifts (22–6), Crewe Wolves (20–16) and Kingston Warriors (46–10) all came in the second half of the season, after an opening sequence of six successive losses including a 6–100 drubbing at the hands of West London.

The season was notable for scrum-half Terry Reader's individual achievement of successfully kicking 29 successive conversions.

Season's Record
First Grade

Rugby League Conference South

05/05/2001 Bedford Swifts 38 South London Storm 10
12/05/2001 South London Storm 0 North London Skolars 90
19/05/2001 Crewe Wolves 36 South London Storm 25
26/05/2001 Crawley Jets 66 South London Storm 12
02/06/2001 South London Storm 26 Kingston Warriors 38
09/06/2001 West London Sharks 100 South London Storm 6
16/06/2001 South London Storm 22 Bedford Swifts 6
30/06/2001 North London Skolars 42 South London Storm 12
07/07/2001 South London Storm 20 Crewe Wolves 16
14/07/2001 South London Storm 12 Crawley Jets 72
21/07/2001 Kingston Warriors 10 South London Storm 46
04/08/2001 South London Storm 16 West London Sharks 41

2002
2002 was the season when South London finally started to fulfil their potential. New Zealander Anthony Lipscombe took up the coaching reins, and brought about a steady improvement to the team's performances on the park.
Storm's pre-season preparation got off to a good start with a surprise success in the prestigious St Albans 9s Festival. Using a squad made up of mainly new players, they defeated their Centurion hosts quite comfortably in the Final.
The regular season saw Storm suffer a succession of frustratingly narrow defeats – most by ten points or less – to finish bottom of the South Division, but it was in the end-of-season Shield Play Offs that saw the team hit form.
Group wins over Kingston Warriors (28–22 and 36–4) and Oxford Cavaliers (21–12 in both games), took South London to Cheltenham’s Prince of Wales Stadium for a semi-final clash with Crewe Wolves. It was a tough encounter that for long periods looked to be going Wolves’ way, but Storm dug in to prevail 21–14, courtesy of two late tries from Carl Zacharow and Keri Ryan.

A fortnight later, also at the Prince of Wales Stadium, South London met Bedford Swifts in the Rugby League Conference Shield Final, where they treated the large crowd, and the Sky TV cameras, to an exhilarating display of running rugby. Storm ran in ten tries in a runaway 54–2 victory, Caro Wild led the way with a hat-trick, Daniel Poireaudeau grabbed two, and Terry Reader, Keri Ryan, Nathan Price-Saleh, Aaron Russell and Alun Watkins pitched in with one apiece.

The final whistle sparked terrific celebrations both on the pitch and in the stand where Storm's large traveling support cheered Keri Ryan as he lifted the club's first ever major trophy.

Once again Storm fielded a second team in the London League, and although wins were hard to come by, only one all season, the players showed great enthusiasm with a number graduating to the first team.
The season ended with the club's first overseas tour. A party of 24 travelled to the south of France to play French National One club Realmont XIII. In front of a crowd of 750 – a quarter of the town's population – Storm put up a brave performance, but were eventually downed 18–36.

To round off the club's most successful season ever, Captain Keri Ryan was named at stand-off in the 2002 Rugby League Conference Dream Team, and full-back Corey Simms was named the competition's Young Player Of The Year.

Fittingly, the club was also presented with the award for Rugby League Conference Club of The Year 2002.

Season's Record
First Grade

Rugby League Conference South

04/05/2002 Kingston Warriors 36 South London Storm 22
11/05/2002 South London Storm 20 West London Sharks 32
18/05/2002 North London Skolars 66 South London Storm 16
25/05/2002 Oxford Cavaliers 40 South London Storm 30
01/06/2002 South London Storm 16 Crawley Jets 48
08/06/2002 South London Storm 42 Kingston Warriors 18
22/06/2002 West London Sharks 32 South London Storm 18
29/06/2002 South London Storm 6 North London Skolars 50
06/07/2002 South London Storm 38 Oxford Cavaliers 50
13/07/2002 Crawley Jets 80 South London Storm 0

RLC Shield Play Offs

27/07/2002 Kingston Warriors 22 South London Storm 28 (Group)
03/08/2002 South London Storm 20 Oxford Cavaliers 12 (Group)
10/08/2002 South London Storm 36 Kingston Warriors 4 (Group)
17/08/2002 Oxford Cavaliers 12 South London Storm 20 (Group)
24/08/2002 Crewe Wolves 14 South London Storm 21 (Semi-Final)
31/08/2002 South London Storm 54 Bedford Swifts 2 (Final)

2003
Buoyed by their success in the RLC Shield, Storm were encouraged to apply for membership of the newly formed National League Three. The application was successful, however,  following a number of internal meetings the club reluctantly decided against taking the step up and instead remain in the RLC. However, only four weeks before the start of the season local rivals Crawley Jets folded, and Storm accepted the RFL's last minute invitation to participate in NL3. The club also entered a second team in the RLC, and employed the first full-time Rugby League Development Officer in the area, accelerating the junior development program started by volunteers in 2000.  Under the South London Storm “umbrella” are the three junior feeder clubs formed – the Croydon Hurricanes, Thornton Heath Tornadoes, and the Brixton Bulls.

Coached by ex-London Broncos player Darryl Pitt, the club opened their league campaign with an against-the-odds 24–16 victory over Huddersfield Underbank Rangers. It was a win that was all the more remarkable for the fact that they were down to 12 men after only 5 seconds; prop Mick Smith having been sent off in the first tackle. Storm registered a further five wins in the season but missed out on the end of season play-offs.

The club made a second tour to France in September, losing 22–48 against a Salses XIII line up containing three ex-French internationals.

In November Storm played a charity match against an Australian Legends of League side including the likes of Jason Hetherington, Trevor Gillmeister, Craig Coleman, Andrew Farrar and Peter Tunks. Both teams served the enthusiastic crowd of three or four hundred with an exciting end-to-end contest played in a manner befitting the occasion. The result was irrelevant; although for the record the score was 24–20 in favour of the Legends.

That same month Storm played their first ever Rugby League Challenge Cup game when they hosted National Conference side West Bowling in the Preliminary Round, losing 4–36.

In 2003 Storm were represented at International level for the first time when U15 player Adam Janowski was selected to play for England U15s against their Welsh counterparts at Easter.

Season's Record
Rugby League Conference Cup

03/03/2003 South London Storm 24 West London Sharks 24
09/03/2003 Greenwich Admirals 6 South London Storm 16
16/03/2003 North London Skolars 34 South London Storm 20
23/03/2003 South London Storm 14 North London Skolars 15
30/03/2003 West London Sharks 16 South London Storm 30
05/04/2003 South London Storm 62 Greenwich Admirals 20
13/04/2003 Aberavon Fighting Irish 10 South London Storm 44 (Quarter-Final)
18/04/2003 North London Skolars 28 South London Storm 19 (Semi-Final)

First Grade

National League 3

03/05/2003 South London Storm 24 Huddersfield Underbank Rangers 16
10/05/2003 Dudley Hill 42 South London Storm 0
17/05/2003 Coventry Bears 20 South London Storm 14
31/05/2003 South London Storm 28 Sheffield Hillsborough Hawks 22
07/06/2003 Manchester Knights 2 South London Storm 42
14/06/2003 St Albans Centurions 38 South London Storm 18
21/06/2003 Sheffield Hillsborough Hawks 36 South London Storm 10
28/06/2003 South London Storm 26 Hemel Stags 8
05/07/2003 South London Storm 6 St Albans Centurions 28
12/06/2003 South London Storm 32 Teesside Steelers 36
19/07/2003 Hemel Stags 16 South London Storm 22
26/06/2003 South London Storm 4 Woolston Rovers (Warrington) 32
02/08/2003 South London Storm 34 Coventry Bears 22
09/08/2003 Woolston Rovers (Warrington) 44 South London Storm 14

Second Grade

Rugby League Conference South

03/05/2003 Gosport Vikings 80 South London Storm 4
10/05/2003 South London Storm 16 Greenwich Admirals 40
17/05/2003 South London Storm 18 Hemel Stags 12
31/05/2003 South London Storm 0 Crawley Jets 88
07/06/2003 South London Storm 14 Gosport Vikings 24
14/06/2003 West London Sharks 88 South London Storm 12
28/06/2003 Greenwich Admirals 62 South London Storm 8
05/07/2003 South London Storm 16 Kingston Warriors 26
12/07/2003 North London Skolars 82 South London Storm 8
19/07/2003 Crawley Jets 88 South London Storm 6

2004
Storm again participated in National League Three and after victories in their opening three games, against Manchester, Bradford Dudley Hill and Birmingham, they topped the division for the one and only time. However, after the promising start, the season tailed off and once again Storm narrowly missed out on the play-offs.  During the year Storm were awarded the Active Sports Club of the Year award from 400 participating sports clubs signed up to the Active Sports program, the biggest sports development programme in London.  The club also embarked on a historic tour to Australia – the first British Rugby League team to tour Australia since 1997 – with games against Beerwah Bulldogs and Gympie Devils in Sunshine Coast, Queensland.

The season closed with a second tour of the year, this time to Toulouse, where they drew 22–22 against Villeneuve Tolosane.

Season's Record
First Grade

National League 3

01/05/2004 Manchester Knights 12 South London Storm 28
08/05/2004 South London Storm 18 Bradford Dudley Hill 15
22/05/2004 South London Storm 26 Birmingham Bulldogs 14
29/05/2004 St Albans Centurions 30 South London Storm 22
31/05/2004 South London Storm 54 Essex Eels 18
05/06/2004 Sheffield Hillsborough Hawks 26 South London Storm 18
12/06/2004 South London Storm 26 Bramley Buffaloes 20
26/06/2004 Coventry Bears 46 South London Storm 14
03/07/2004 Gateshead Storm 20 South London Storm 32
10/07/2004 South London Storm v Woolston Rovers (Warrington) (Match abandoned)
17/07/2004 Huddersfield Underbank Rangers 24 South London Storm 24
24/07/2004 South London Storm 36 Carlisle Centurions 16
31/07/2004 Birmingham Bulldogs 32 South London Storm 30
07/08/2004 South London Storm 20 St Albans Centurions 24
14/08/2004 Essex Eels 14 South London Storm 54
21/08/2004 South London Storm 34 Sheffield Hillsborough Hawks 35
28/08/2004 Bramley Buffaloes 32 South London Storm 18
30/08/2004 Hemel Stags 54 South London Storm 6
04/09/2004 South London Storm 12 Hemel Stags 38
11/09/2004 South London Storm 18 Coventry Bears 28

 Home match versus Woolston Rovers (Warrington) abandoned due to an injury.

Second Grade

Rugby League Conference South

01/05/2004 Kingston Warriors 58 South London Storm 0
08/05/2004 South London Storm 20 Gosport & Fareham Vikings 22
22/05/2004 West London Sharks 54 South London Storm 16
05/06/2004 Greenwich Admirals 46 South London Storm 6
12/06/2004 South London Storm 24 Kingston Warriors 42
19/06/2004 Gosport & Fareham Vikings 46 South London Storm 12
26/06/2004 South London Storm 0 West London Sharks 88
03/07/2004 South London Storm 10 Greenwich Admirals 44

2005
As the cost of travelling to places as far afield as Carlisle and Gateshead began to spiral, Storm took the decision to apply for, and were admitted to, the newly created RLC South Premier for the 2005 season and appointed Rob Powell as Director of Coaching. The season proved to be a success with the club winning its first round Rugby League Challenge Cup match against West London Sharks (24–20) in front of a crowd of 1,000. However, the Powergen Challenge Cup run came to an end in the second round when they were beaten 50–24 at Castleford Lock Lane, despite having surprising led at half-time.

During the RLC South Premier campaign the first team dominated the group and won all but one game during the season. The team lost in the national semi-final against Bridgend Blue Bulls, the competition's eventual winners, but the season ended on a high by beating the other 85 clubs to the RLC Club of the Year award for the 2nd time in 4 years.

Season's Record
First Grade

Rugby League Conference Premier South

07/05/2005 South London Storm 82 Ipswich Rhinos 6
14/05/2005 London Skolars A 0 South London Storm 64
21/05/2005 South London Storm 72 Sunderland Nissan 6
28/05/2005 South London Storm 46 Greenwich Admirals 0
04/06/2005 Luton Vipers 4 South London Storm 68
11/06/2005 South London Storm 52 West London Sharks 14
18/06/2005 Sunderland Nissan 4 South London Storm 76
25/06/2005 Ipswich Rhinos 16 South London Storm 24
02/07/2005 South London Storm 94 London Skolars A 4
09/07/2005 Greenwich Admirals 4 South London Storm 76
16/07/2005 South London Storm vs Luton Vipers – Won: Walkover
23/07/2005 West London Sharks 46 South London Storm 10

 Luton Vipers forfeit a fixture

RLC Premier Play Offs

30/07/2005 South London Storm 70 West London Sharks 6 (Divisional Play Off)
13/08/2005 South London Storm 24 West London Sharks 8 (Divisional Final)
21/08/2005 Bridgend Blue Bulls 34 South London Storm 18 (National Semi-Final)

Second Grade

Rugby League Conference South

07/05/2005 South London Storm 28 Hemel Stags 36
21/05/2005 South London Storm 38 West London 52
28/05/2005 Haringey Hornets 50 South London Storm 12
04/06/2005 Kingston Warriors 41 South London Storm 18
11/06/2005 Hemel Stags 42 South London Storm 18
25/06/2005 West London Sharks 46 South London Storm 16
02/07/2005 South London Storm 18 Haringey Hornets 48
09/07/2005 South London Storm 6 Kingston Warriors 100

2006
The 2006 summer season was to be the most successful for South London Storm as a club, with both senior teams winning their leagues, successes for the 4 Storm youth clubs, and the first team being crowned RLC National Champions.

Despite pressure from the Ipswich Rhinos, Storm once again won the South division of the RLC Premier. After disposing of the Bridgend team in the semi-final, they crushed the East Lancashire Lions in the final at Broadstreet RUFC by 30 points to nil.

This rounded off a successful season that included the London League title for the second team who defeated Luton Vipers in the Final.

Season's Record
First Grade

Rugby League Conference Premier South

29/04/2006 South London Storm 54 West London Sharks 24
06/05/2006 South London Storm 30 Coventry Bears 18
13/05/2006 South London Storm 34 Haringey Hornets 28
20/05/2006 Essex Eels 6 South London Storm 68
27/05/2006 South London Storm 46 Kingston Warriors 18
10/06/2006 Ipswich Rhinos 32 South London Storm 14
17/06/2006 West London Sharks 34 South London Storm 24
24/06/2006 Coventry Bears 28 South London Storm 32
01/07/2006 Haringey Hornets 30 South London Storm 34
08/07/2006 South London Storm 80 Kingston Warriors 12
29/07/2006 South London Storm 46 Ipswich Rhinos 8

RLC Premier Play Offs

12/08/2006 South London Storm 52 Ipswich Rhinos 10 (Divisional Final)
20/08/2006 South London Storm 32 Bridgend Blue Bulls 12 (National Semi-Final)
03/09/2006 East Lancashire Lions 0 South London Storm 30 (Jepson Trophy Final)

Second Grade

London League

29/04/2006 South London Storm 66 West London Sharks 22
06/05/2006 West London Sharks 36 South London Storm 20
13/05/2006 Bedford Tigers 16 South London Storm 32
20/05/2006 Southend Seaxes 14 South London Storm 40
27/05/2006 Kentish Tigers 24 South London Storm 33
17/06/2006 West London Sharks 38 South London Storm 38
24/06/2006 Luton Vipers 54 South London Storm 6
08/07/2006 Smallford Saints 40 South London Storm 38
22/07/2006 South London Storm 38 West London Sharks 26

London League Play Offs

06/08/2006 South London Storm 44 Bedford Tigers 14 (Semi-Final)	
12/06/2006 South London Storm 52 Luton Vipers 20 (Final)

2007
After the success of the previous season, 2007 was always going to be a tough year. Coach Rob Powell moved on to Super League's Harlequins RL, and was replaced by Andy Gilvary and Dave Wilson. Meanwhile, ten of the Grand Final winning team moved on to pastures new.

The season kicked off with a Challenge Cup First Round game away to Thornhill Trojans, but playing out of season the Londoners were no match for the National Conference League Premier Division side and lost 18–58.

Season's Record
First Grade

Rugby League Conference Premier South

14/04/2007 West London Sharks 16 South London Storm 56
28/04/2007 South London Storm 26 St Albans Centurions 22
12/05/2007 South London Storm 18 Ipswich Rhinos 4
19/05/2007 West London Sharks 28 South London Storm 32
26/05/2007 London Skolars A 26 South London Storm 42
02/06/2007 South London Storm 74 Kent Ravens 2
09/06/2007 South London Storm 22 London Skolars 22
16/06/2007 South London Storm vs Kingston Warriors – Won: Walkover
30/06/2007 Ipswich Rhinos 25 South London Storm 24
07/07/2007 South London Storm 36 West London Sharks 18
15/07/2007 St Albans Centurions 32 South London Storm 16
21/07/2007 Kent Ravens 0 South London Storm 66
28/07/2007 South London Storm 32 London Skolars A 33
04/08/2007 South London Storm 56 Kingston Warriors 22

RLC Premier Play Offs

11/08/2007 South London Storm 48 London Skolars 24 (Divisional Semi-Final)
18/08/2007 South London Storm 10 St Albans Centurions 18 (Divisional Final)

Second Grade

London League

28/04/2007 South London Storm 22 London Griffins 38
12/05/2007 South London Storm 26 Southgate Skolars 29
19/05/2007 West London Sharks 56 South London Storm 14
02/06/2007 South London Storm 82 Kent Ravens 10
16/06/2007 South London Storm 42 Smallford Saints 18
23/06/2007 Farnborough Falcons 40 South London Storm 28
07/07/2007 South London Storm 18 West London Sharks 24
14/07/2007 Southgate Skolars 72 South London Storm 6
21/07/2007 Kent Ravens 18 South London Storm 30

London League Play Offs

04/08/2007 St Albans Centurions 40 South London Storm 22 (Quarter-Final)

2008
Storm once again reached the RLC Premier South Grand Final but were defeated 20–24 by West London Sharks, with the game-breaking try coming two minutes from the end of the match.

Season's Record
First Grade

Rugby League Conference Premier South

19/04/2008 Ipswich Rhinos 32 South London Storm 12
03/05/2008 St Albans Centurions 32 South London Storm 12
10/05/2008 South London Storm 22 West London Sharks 48
17/05/2008 London Skolars 12 South London Storm 30
24/05/2008 US Portsmouth 22 South London Storm 16
07/06/2008 South London Storm 70 Elmbridge 8
14/06/2008 South London Storm 36 Ipswich Rhinos 16
21/06/2008 South London Storm 42 St Albans Centurions 10
28/06/2008 West London Sharks 38 South London Storm 10
05/07/2008 South London Storm 44 London Skolars 12
12/07/2008 South London Storm 58 US Portsmouth 14
26/07/2008 Elmbridge 22 South London Storm 58

RLC Premier Play Offs

09/08/2008 South London Storm 20 Ipswich Rhinos 14 (Divisional Semi-Final)
16/08/2008 West London Sharks 24 South London Storm 20 (Divisional Final)

Second Grade

London League

03/05/2008 St Albans Centurions 14 South London Storm 12
10/05/2008 South London Storm 24 West London Sharks 42
17/05/2008 Southgate Skolars 12 South London Storm 16
07/06/2008 Kent Ravens 54 South London Storm 42
28/06/2008 West London Sharks 62 South London Storm 14
14/07/2008 South London Storm 48 Southampton Spitfires 18
12/07/2008 Feltham YOI 52 South London Storm 64
23/07/2008 South London Storm 26 Metropolitan Police 34
26/07/2008 South London Storm 34 Kent Ravens 30

London League Play Offs

02/08/2008 Southampton Spitfires 44 South London Storm 20 (Quarter-Final)

2009
Storm will again participate in the Premier South Division of the RLC. Their opposing teams will be Bedford Tigers, Elmbridge, Hainault Bulldogs, Ipswich Rhinos, London Skolars A, St Albans Centurions, Portsmouth Navy Seahawks and West London Sharks.

Season's Record
First Grade

Rugby League Conference Premier South

 13/04/09 London Skolars 22 South London Storm 54
 25/04/09 Elmbridge 10 South London Storm 54
 02/05/09 Portsmouth Navy Seahawks 24 South London Storm 80
 09/05/09 South London Storm 66 Hainault Bulldogs 4
 16/05/09 South London Storm 102 Bedford Tigers 12
 23/05/09 St Albans Centurions 20 South London Storm 48
 30/05/09 South London Storm 56 London Skolars 18
 06/06/09 West London Sharks 8 South London Storm 24
 13/06/09 Ipswich Rhinos 14 South London Storm 26
 27/06/09 South London Storm 73 Portsmouth Navy Seahawks 30
 04/07/09 Bedford Tigers vs South London Storm – Won: Walkover
 11/07/09 South London Storm 40 St Albans Centurions 10
 18/07/09 South London Storm 40 West London Sharks 30
 25/07/09 South London Storm vs Ipswich Rhinos – Won: Walkover

 Bedford Tigers and Ipswich Rhinos each forfeit a fixture.

RLC Premier Play Offs
 15/08/09 South London Storm 58 Ipswich Rhinos 12 (Divisional Semi-Final)
 22/08/09 South London Storm 16 West London Sharks 26 (Divisional Final)

Second Grade

London League
 25/04/09 Guildford Giants 20 South London Storm 28
 16/05/09 South London Storm 6 Hammersmith Hills Hoists 54
 23/05/09 St Albans Centurions 10 South London Storm 56
 06/06/09 West London Sharks 34 South London Storm 36
 24/06/09 Hammersmith Hills Hoists 64 South London Storm 14
 27/06/09 South London Storm 48 Sussex Merlins 34
 25/07/09 South London Storm 66 Hemel Stags 14
 02/08/09 Sussex Merlins 40 South London Storm 34

London League Play Offs
 16/08/09 Hemel Stags 24 South London Storm 16 (Semi-Final)

Academy Grade

 18/04/09 Kent Ravens 18 South London Storm 28
 25/04/09 South London Storm 40 Medway Dragons 6
 09/05/09 South London Storm 40 Greenwich Admirals 16
 06/06/09 Medway Dragons 22 South London Storm 20
 18/07/09 South London Storm 46 Greenwich Admirals 26 (Final at Staines RFC)

2010

Season's Record
First Grade

Rugby League Conference Premier South

 01/05/10 West London Sharks 34 South London Storm 20
 08/05/10 South London Storm vs Portsmouth Navy Seahawks – Won: Walkover
 15/05/10 Hainault Bulldogs 34 South London Storm 28
 22/05/10 South London Storm 56 Eastern Rhinos 10
 29/05/10 St Albans Centurions 36 South London Storm 4
 05/06/10 Hammersmith Hillhoists 36 South London Storm 32
 19/06/10 South London Storm 38 London Skolars 6
 26/06/10 South London Storm 16 West London Sharks 58
 03/07/10 South London Storm 48 Portsmouth Navy Seahawks 28
 10/07/10 South London Storm 50 Hainaut Bulldogs 42
 17/07/10 Eastern Rhinos 30 South London Storm 22
 24/07/10 South London Storm 6 St Albans Centurions 60
 31/07/10 South London Storm 18 Hammersmith Hillhoists 52
 07/08/10 London Skolars vs South London Storm – Won: Walkover

  Not including games forfeited by Portsmouth (h) and London Skolars (a).

Second Grade

Rugby League Conference
 01/05/10 South London Storm 40 Guildford Giants 22
 08/05/10 South London Storm 40 Southampton Spitfires 14
 15/05/10 South London Storm 54 Sussex Merlins 22
 22/05/10 Elmbridge Eagles 90 South London Storm 4
 05/06/09 South London Storm 98 Swindon St George 0
 09/06/10 Greenwich Admirals 14 South London Storm 16
 12/06/10 Oxford Cavaliers 24 South London Storm 40
 19/06/10 Guildford Giants 62 South London Storm 12
 26/06/10 Southampton Spitfires vs South London Storm – Lost: Walkover
 03/07/10 Sussex Merlins 50 South London Storm 20
 10/07/10 South London Storm 4 Elmbridge Eagles 72
 17/07/10 South London Storm 6 Greenwich Admirals 64
 24/07/10 Swindon St George vs South London Storm – Lost: Walkover
 31/07/10 South London Storm vs Oxford Cavaliers – Won: Walkover

2011

Season's Record
First Grade

Rugby League Conference Premier South

 30/04/11 South London Storm 26 St Albans Centurions 32
 07/05/11 Eastern Rhinos 46 South London Storm 14
 14/05/11 West London Sharks 28 South London Storm 18
 21/05/11 Hainault Bulldogs 14 South London Storm 40
 04/06/11 Hammersmith Hills Hoists 30 South London Storm 6
 11/06/11 St Albans Centurions 46 South London Storm 10
 28/06/11 South London Storm 22 Eastern Rhinos 32 (@ St Albans)
 25/06/11 South London Storm 24 West London Sharks 22
 02/07/11 South London Storm 32 London Skolars 18
 09/07/11 South London Storm 18 Hammersmith Hills Hoists 62
 16/07/11 South London Storm 24 Eastern Rhinos 42
 23/07/11 South London Storm 20 West London Sharks 22
 30/07/11 Hammersmith Hills Hoists vs South London Storm

Second Grade

London League
 07/05/11 London Skolars 'A' 56 South London Storm 16
 21/05/11 Phantoms RL 4 South London Storm 70
 04/06/11 Hammersmith Hills Hoists 'A' 60 South London Storm 20
 18/06/11 St Albans Centurions 'A' 24 South London Storm 10
 18/06/11 Bedford Tigers 'A' 16 South London Storm 10 (@ St Albans)
 25/06/11 South London Storm 0 Mudchute Uncles 28
 09/07/11 South London Storm 18 Hammersmith Hills Hoists 'A' 36
 16/07/11 South London Storm vs Hemel Stags 'A'
 23/07/11 South London Storm vs Greenwich Admirals 'A'
 30/07/11 Hammersmith Hills Hoists 'A' vs South London Storm

Challenge Cup Record
 29/11/2003 South London Storm 4 West Bowling 36 (1st Round)
 05/02/2005 South London Storm 24 West London Sharks 20 (1st Round)
 19/02/2005 Castleford Lock Lane 50 South London Storm 24 (2nd Round)
 03/02/2007 Thornhill Trojans 58 South London Storm 18 (1st Round)

External links
Official Website
Storm Facebook Page
Storm YouTube Channel
London RL
Rugby League Conference
South London Storm vs London Skolars A 2009 on YouTube
Thornhill Trojans vs South London Storm 2007 on YouTube
South London Storm Development 2007 on YouTube
South London Storm vs London Skolars 2007 on YouTube

References

Rugby League Conference teams
Sport in the London Borough of Croydon
Rugby league teams in London
Rugby clubs established in 1997